Mazayjan Rural District is a rural district (dehestan) in the Central District of Bavanat County, Fars Province, Iran. At the 2006 census, its population was 5,440, in 1,460 families.  The rural district has 8 villages.

References 

Rural Districts of Fars Province
Bavanat County